Peter Stephanus Blok (born 7 April 1960 in The Hague), known as Peter Blok, is a Dutch stage, television, film, and voice actor.

Filmography

References

External links

1960 births
Dutch male actors
Dutch male film actors
Dutch male television actors
Dutch male stage actors
Living people
Golden Calf winners
20th-century Dutch male actors
Male actors from The Hague